Synelasma bufo is a species of beetle in the family Cerambycidae. It was described by Francis Polkinghorne Pascoe in 1858.

Subspecies
 Synelasma bufo sumatranus Breuning, 1954
 Synelasma bufo bufo Pascoe, 1858

References

Pteropliini
Beetles described in 1858